Charles Nelson Manning (born March 31, 1979) is a former professional baseball relief pitcher who last played for the Southern Maryland Blue Crabs. He played part of the 2008 season in Major League Baseball for the Washington Nationals. He went to the University of Tampa and is listed with a height of 6'2 and weight of 180 pounds. Manning throws and bats left-handed.

Career
Manning was selected in the 9th round of the 2001 Major League Baseball Draft by the New York Yankees. On July 31, 2003, Manning was traded to the Cincinnati Reds with Brandon Claussen for Aaron Boone. The Yankees re-acquired him on June 18, 2004, for Gabe White. Manning was a  Eastern League Mid-Season All-Star. He spent the  season with Double-A Trenton and Triple-A Scranton.

Manning became a minor league free agent after the 2007 season and signed with the Washington Nationals. On May 23, the Nationals called Manning up from Triple-A Columbus.

On October 15, 2008, Manning was picked up on waivers by the St. Louis Cardinals. He was acquired for use in spot relief situations against left-handed hitters, but did not make the Cardinals roster. In , he pitched for the Memphis Redbirds, the Cardinals' top farm team. He became a free agent again after the season, and did not pitch again until joining the Southern Maryland Blue Crabs in the Atlantic League of Professional Baseball in 2011, who he played with from 2011 to 2013.

References

External links

Major League Baseball pitchers
Washington Nationals players
Staten Island Yankees players
Tampa Yankees players
Norwich Navigators players
Potomac Cannons players
Trenton Thunder players
Columbus Clippers players
Chattanooga Lookouts players
Scranton/Wilkes-Barre Yankees players
Memphis Redbirds players
Southern Maryland Blue Crabs players
Baseball players from Florida
People from Winter Haven, Florida
1979 births
Living people
Tampa Spartans baseball players
Sportspeople from Winter Haven, Florida